William Boyd Sloan (July 9, 1895 – October 22, 1970) was a United States district judge of the United States District Court for the Northern District of Georgia.

Education and career

Born in Gainesville, Georgia, Sloan read law to enter the bar in 1915. He was in private practice from 1915 to 1951. He was a member of the Georgia House of Representatives from 1927 to 1931. He was an assistant attorney general of the State of Georgia from 1932 to 1933. He was a Judge of the City Court of Hall County, Georgia from 1934 to 1945, and then of the Superior Court of Georgia for the Northeast Judicial Circuit, from 1945 to 1948.

Federal judicial service

On February 19, 1951, Sloan was nominated by President Harry S. Truman to a seat on the United States District Court for the Northern District of Georgia vacated by Judge M. Neil Andrews. Sloan was confirmed by the United States Senate on March 20, 1951, and received his commission on March 23, 1951. He assumed senior status on August 1, 1965, serving in that capacity until his death on October 22, 1970.

References

Sources
 

1895 births
1970 deaths
Georgia (U.S. state) state court judges
Judges of the United States District Court for the Northern District of Georgia
United States district court judges appointed by Harry S. Truman
20th-century American judges
United States federal judges admitted to the practice of law by reading law